Settsassiidae is an extinct family of fossil sea snails, marine gastropod molluscs in the clade Hypsogastropoda.

According to the taxonomy of the Gastropoda by Bouchet & Rocroi (2005), the family Settsassiidae has no subfamilies. It is unassigned to a superfamily.

References